WKD also known as Wicked is a brand of alcopop produced by Beverage Brands. It is sold and heavily marketed in the United Kingdom and Ireland with the slogan ‘Have you got a WKD (for "wicked") side?’, and also in many countries in mainland Europe. AC Nielsen ranked it as the number-one UK ready-to-drink (RTD) alcopop in 2006. In December 2014 to comply with alcohol tax laws and to minimise future tax increases, “Alcoholic Mix WKD” replaced the old “Original WKD”, and the old Original Mix is now no longer available in both the UK and Ireland. The small change to the alcohol element of the WKD was not intended to change the taste of the product and still contains triple distilled vodka. In addition, it contains an alternative alcohol base (not wine) to minimise tax. The actual recipe remains unchanged.
The WKD bottling facility in Ayrshire, Scotland closed in November 2022 due to rising costs.

Product information
WKD originally contained 5.5% alcohol by volume (ABV), but this was reduced to 5% in October 2003, to 4.5% on 25 July 2005, and later to 4%, current as of 2022. The drink was launched in August 1996 in Scotland under the name 'Wicked'. Initially available in 330ml bottles, the bottles were later reduced to 275ml, matching other alcopops. The 275ml bottles are sold in pubs, bars, and shops across the UK, with shops also selling multipacks of 4,10 and 12, and 700ml bottles.

Varieties

Current varieties
:

1, 3, 4, 6 and 7 are sold in standard mixed multi-packs.

Discontinued varieties
 WKD Original Vodka Silver
 Clear, "tropical" flavour.
 WKD Blonde
 Apple-flavoured, but not cider-based; yellow.
 WKD Core
Cider-based drink, apple-flavoured, green. Introduced 2009.
 WKD Purple 
"Mixed berry" flavour.
 WKD Green
Green apple flavour.
 WKD Orange
Orange-flavoured and coloured.
WKD Vegas
"Mixed fruit" flavour, dark purple.

Advertising
WKD Vodka has been heavily promoted in the UK. Promotion includes a TV advertising campaign, a national poster campaign, scoreboard sponsorship at Premiership football clubs, giving out samples in bars and clubs, sponsorship, and student tours. Their catchphrase "Have you got a WKD side?" was launched in 2000 and hit TV screens in 2001. The TV adverts feature men pulling pranks or behaving in a strange or selfish manner for the beverage.

Along with several other alcopop or RTD producers, WKD were considered by the UK ASA to be using advertising  likely to appeal to under-18s, and some of their TV adverts were banned.

Sponsorship
WKD was a sponsor of the "WKD Shed Sports Show" which aired on Nuts TV, which had its own channel on Freeview and Sky but closed on 15 January 2009.

WKD has been a sponsor of the "WKD Nuts Football Awards" since this annual event began in 2006.

References

External links
Official website

Premixed alcoholic drinks
Alcopops
British alcoholic drinks
Economy of Devon